Firmin Dugas (March 8, 1830 – March 16, 1889) was a Quebec businessman and political figure. He was a Conservative member of the House of Commons of Canada representing Montcalm from 1871 to 1887 and in the Legislative Assembly of Quebec from 1867 to 1874.

He was born in Rawdon Township, Lower Canada in 1830 and studied at Collège de l'Assomption. Dugas owned and operated several sawmills and flour mills at Saint-Liguori. He was mayor of Saint-Liguori from 1860 to 1862. He was elected to the Quebec assembly in 1867; he was elected to the House of Commons in an 1871 by-election after Joseph Dufresne resigned his seat to accept a post as sheriff. Dugas resigned his seat in the Quebec assembly in 1874 when it became illegal to hold seats in both houses.

He died at Saint-Liguori in 1889.

His son Joseph-Louis-Euclide also later represented Montcalm in the House of Commons.

External links

1830 births
1889 deaths
Conservative Party of Canada (1867–1942) MPs
Members of the House of Commons of Canada from Quebec
Conservative Party of Quebec MNAs
Mayors of places in Quebec